Aleksandar Miličić (Serbian Cyrillic: Александар Миличић; 1946 – 12 March 2021) was a Serbian professional footballer and coach.

Career
Miličić, born in Šabac, played for local club Mačva Šabac from 1963 to 1966 before moving to Voždovački, where he played until 1969. He then transferred to Sloboda Tuzla where he played in over 475 matches.

He was a member of the Sloboda generation that was third in 1976–77 and played in the 1977–78 UEFA Cup where they were eliminated by Las Palmas in the first round. After retiring, he worked as a coach.

Death
Miličić, who suffered from Alzheimer's disease, disappeared on 5 March 2021 after midnight. His frozen body was found next to the Mačva Šabac stadium a week later on 12 March 2021.

References

1946 births
2021 deaths
Sportspeople from Šabac
Yugoslav footballers
Serbian footballers
Association football defenders
FK Mačva Šabac players
FK Voždovac players
FK Sloboda Tuzla players
Yugoslav First League players
Deaths from hypothermia